Alex Bruno is a name. People with that name include:

 Alex Bruno (footballer, born 1982), Brazilian center-back
 Alex Bruno (footballer, born 1993), Brazilian winger

Human name disambiguation pages